The 2014 Asian Indoor Athletics Championships was the sixth edition of the international indoor athletics event between Asian nations. It took place at the Vocational and Technical College Athletics Hall in Hangzhou, China, between 15 and 16 February. The city was confirmed as the host in September 2013 at the 77th Council Meeting of the Asian Athletics Association. This was the second time the city held the event, successively following on from the 2012 Championships. A total of 28 nations were represented at the tournament comprising 26 track and field events.

Qatar won the most gold medals – its contingent of African-born athletes won four of the five men's running events. Its sole native medallist, Mutaz Essa Barshim, gave one of the best performances of the meet with 2.36 m in the men's high jump (one centimetre short of his Asian record) to take his third consecutive title. The host nation China won the most medals overall, with four golds in a haul of twenty. Most of China's medals came from the field events, where it had at least one medallist in each event on the men's and women's sides. Kazakhstan ranked a clear third with four champions and twelve medals in total. From the fifteen nations at reached the medal table, Uzbekistan, Kuwait, Japan and Iran were others that frequently featured on the podium.

Four championship records were improved during the course of the two-day competition. Kazakhstan's men's 4×400 m relay team knocked a second off Saudi Arabia's mark from 2008. Maryam Jamal's time in the women's 3000 metres was a six-second improvement from the previous record by compatriot Shitaye Eshete. China's Wu Shuijiao improved her own record from 2012 with a run of 8.02 seconds in the 60 metres hurdles, which was also a Chinese indoor record. Svetlana Radzivil raised the women's high jump best to 1.96 m, erasing Marina Aitova's height of 1.93 m that had stood since 2006.

Four athletes successfully defended their titles from 2012: Dmitriy Karpov in the men's heptathlon, Maryam Tousi in the women's 400 metres, Mutaz Essa Barshim in the men's high jump, and Wu Shuijiao in the women's 60 m hurdles. Mohamad Al-Garni and Maryam Jamal were the only two competitors who won two individual golds, each of them completing a 1500/3000 metres double. Betlhem Desalegn was the women's runner-up in both those events, and sprinter Maryam Tousi was the only other runner to take multiple individual medals.

Results

Men

Women

Medal table

Participating nations

 (3)
 (51)
 (12)
 (9)
 (5)
 (4)
 (11)
 (1)
 (12)
 (20)
 (8)
 (7)
 (4)
 (6)
 (5)
 (6)
 (7)
 (3)
 (3)
 (10)
 (5)
 (1)
 (1)
 (8)
 (1)
 (5)
 (2)
 (17)

National records
A total of 20 national records were set at the championships. Non-medalling national record performances are listed below.

See also
2014 IAAF World Indoor Championships

References

Results
6th Asian Indoor Championships . Tilastopaja. Retrieved on 2014-02-17.
6th ASIAN INDOOR ATHLETICS CHAMPIONSHIPS Day 1 Results. Asian Athletics Association. Retrieved on 2014-02-17.
Medal table and participation
Medal Table 2014 Asian Indoor Championships. Asian Athletics Association. Retrieved on 2014-02-17.

External links
2014 Asian Indoor Athletics Championships on DrinksBreak.com
Official Asian Athletics Association website

Indoor 2014
Asian Indoor Championships
Asian Indoor Championships
Indoor Championships
Asian Indoor Athletics Championships
Sport in Hangzhou
International athletics competitions hosted by China